Beatdown hardcore (also known as heavy hardcore, brutal hardcore, toughguy, moshcore, or simply beatdown) is a subgenre of hardcore punk with prominent elements of heavy metal. Beatdown hardcore features aggressive vocals, down-tuned electric guitars, gang vocals, heavy guitar riffs, and heavy breakdowns. The genre emerged in the late 1980s and early 1990s with bands such as Killing Time, Madball, and Sheer Terror. In the  1990s and early 2000s, many other beatdown bands emerged, such as Hatebreed, Bulldoze, Shai Hulud, and Strife. Bands such as Terror and Death Before Dishonor gained cult followings in the  2000s. New York hardcore bands such as Agnostic Front, Warzone, Sick of It All, and Cro-Mags and the thrash metal subgenre crossover thrash (e.g.: Suicidal Tendencies and Dirty Rotten Imbeciles) paved the way for beatdown.

Beatdown paved the way for metalcore, another subgenre of hardcore with far more heavy metal elements. Bands like Integrity, Earth Crisis and Hatebreed became prominent metalcore bands in the 1990s.

Beatdown bands typically write lyrics about unity, integrity, stoicism, and perseverance, and bands often have a hypermasculine image and attitude, including emphasis on physical strength and skinhead-influenced fashion including shaved heads, baseball caps, and sports or army clothes. Some bands, like Judge, adhere to ideologies like straight edge, a lifestyle that avoids drugs, avoids alcohol, and sometimes avoids promiscuity. Beatdown has faced criticism for its hypermasculinity, and due to its hypermasculinity, the genre inadvertently became exclusive despite intending to be inclusive. This caused criticism for beatdown because hardcore was supposed to be about inclusion and individuality but inadvertently became exclusive instead. Bands like Eighteen Visions rebelled against the hypermasculine image of hardcore by dressing in effeminate fashion such as eyeliner, dyed hair and skinny jeans; which was flippantly labeled "fashioncore".

Characteristics

Beatdown is a genre of hardcore punk influenced by heavy metal that features aggressive vocals (typically screaming), down-tuned electric guitars, gang vocals, heavy guitar riffs, and heavy breakdowns. More heavy metal-influenced than traditional hardcore punk, beatdown is heavily influenced by thrash metal music and is sometimes influenced by hip hop. According to writer Brian J. Kochan, the genre "embraces the mystique of the gritty and hard working class lives of those in America's big cities". Punknews.org described beatdown as "heavy breakdowns, growly vocals" and "the occasional metal riff". Beatdown bands typically write lyrics about topics like perseverance, stoicism, unity, rebellion against cultural mores, and inner-city strife. Some Beatdown bands, like Judge, also adhere to ideologies like straight edge, a lifestyle that avoids drugs, avoids alcohol, and, in some cases, avoids promiscuity. Many beatdown bands often feature a hypermasculine or "tough guy" image or attitude, with clothing and haircuts consisting of shaved heads, tattoos, baseball caps, army clothes, and sports clothes.

History

Predecessors (1980s)

In the early 1980s, hardcore punk quickly spread with the emergence of bands like Black Flag, Minor Threat, and the Dead Kennedys. When Washington D.C. hardcore punk band the Bad Brains moved to New York, the New York hardcore scene was kickstarted. As the scene progressed many bands began to emerge that took significant influence from heavy metal and hip hop music. Some musicians in the New York hardcore scene cultivated a "tough guy ethos" through use of criminal violence and bigotry. For some bands, particularly the Cro-Mags there was an active effort to search out musicians who bore this ethos. This was prominent enough within the band's sound that AllMusic writer Patrick Kennedy called their 1986 debut album the Age of Quarrel the "finest hour... [of] tough-guy hardcore". While this led to widespread criticism from other hardcore scenes of the time, many of these bands began to develop a unique style that was based more around rhythm and less around the influence of punk.

Origins (late 1980s and early–mid 1990s)

One of the earliest beatdown hardcore acts was the Yonkers, New York band Breakdown. Formed in 1987, they were a part of a new wave of New York hardcore bands similarly expanding the scope of the genre, like Sick of It All, Sheer Terror and Krakdown. Killing Time (then known as Raw Deal), who emerged around the same time, were also an early band in the genre. Killing Time released its debut album Brightside in 1989. The album has been compared to the heavy metal band Metallica. During the late 1980s and  1990s, other beatdown bands, such as Sheer Terror, Madball, Judge, and Maximum Penalty, also emerged. Madball, one of the bands that helped launch the beatdown genre with its crossover thrash-esque style, released its debut album Set It Off in 1994. Jason Anderson of AllMusic noted the album's "raw lyrics and thick guitar grooves". Sheer Terror used obvious heavy metal influences in its music, using, according to Eduardo Rivadavia of AllMusic, "staccato picking, slow-as-molasses power chords," and "double kick drums". According to Ryan Downey of AllMusic, Judge added "a thick, metallic guitar crunch to the by then standard manic, angst-ridden, and ragged neo-punk sound of the mid- to late-'80s underground hardcore scene."

Underground popularity (mid–late 1990s and 2000s)

During the mid–late 1990s and early 2000s, the beatdown genre was being played by more bands. Bands such as Strife, Shai Hulud, Bulldoze, and Hatebreed, all became prominent beatdown bands during this time. Strife became one of the most prominent bands of the late 1990s hardcore scene. Bulldoze was an influential hardcore band. Shai Hulud released its debut album Hearts Once Nourished with Hope and Compassion in 1997. In an AllMusic review for the album, writer Jason D. Taylor wrote: "Anyone half interested in finding out more about hardcore should get a copy of Hearts Once Nourished for a first lesson in 'Hardcore 101.'" Taylor also wrote: "While Shai Hulud may not have pioneered the genre, they certainly deserve recognition for releasing one of the genre's most exquisite masterpieces." Hatebreed, one of the most famous bands from the beatdown genre, released its debut album Satisfaction is the Death of Desire in 1997, which made them one of the most prominent bands in the hardcore scene. The album sold at least 150,000 copies. Hatebreed's second album and major label debut, Perseverance (2002), featured a heavier style of metalcore (a much more metal-inspired subgenre of hardcore). Perseverance, according to Nielsen SoundScan, sold at least nearly 220,000 copies in the United States. More bands that play beatdown gained cult followings in the mid–late 2000s. Examples include Bury Your Dead, Terror, and Death Before Dishonor.

Terminology

Beatdown hardcore is also sometimes referred to as "toughguy", "heavy hardcore", "moshcore", and "brutal hardcore". In an interview with Alex Dunne of the hardcore punk band Crime in Stereo, Dunne said that beatdown is sometimes referred to as simply "hardcore", stating that "there's really two hardcores, if you want to get into it". Dunne said bands like Minor Threat, Bad Brains, Lifetime, Avail, and Gorilla Biscuits are examples of hardcore that he grew up with, while examples of the other type of hardcore, which "often gets referred to as 'tough guy' hardcore", is "bands more influenced by Agnostic Front and Madball and Sheer Terror". Dunne described the latter as "what people think of" "when you say  According to the website Vice, "there are two types of hardcore. Well, actually, there are about a thousand different subgenres of hardcore but you can put them all into two main categories: tough guy hardcore and non-tough guy hardcore." Vice explained the difference between the two by describing "tough guy hardcore" as "all well and good for when you want to be mad at the world and lift weights and stuff." Aubin Paul of Punknews.org wrote that "the brand of metal-infused hardcore that Victory was pushing" during the 1990s "represents the majority of modern hardcore, with relatively few bands representing the older roots". Paul described "the older roots" (traditional hardcore punk) as  hardcore bands like Minor Threat, Black Flag and the Bad Brains". Freddy Cricien of Madball said of the hardcore genre's connection to punk rock: "Our music has always been hardcore. That's nothing against punk rock. We can't not acknowledge the fact that what we created came form a punk background." Cricien spoke about the "tough guy hardcore" label and its distinction from traditional hardcore punk:

Hypermasculinity in the genre

Beatdown has received criticism for its hypermasculine style, attitude and image. The inner-city strife of New York in the late 20th century caused a hypermasculine style for many New York hardcore bands, which influenced many emerging hardcore bands to feature a hypermasculine image and attitude. This resulted in the New York hardcore bands continuing to have hypermasculinity, and, in turn, the hardcore genre at large having hegemonic masculinity and a homogeneously male population. Jake Tiernan of webzine Heavy Blog is Heavy criticized the hypermasculinity of hardcore by writing that the hardcore scene encourages a herd mentality and causes physical violence, which defies what punk, hardcore's roots, is about because punk is about individuality. Tiernan believed hardcore's hypermasculinity and socially mandatory moshpits caused exclusion when the scene was initially intended to be about individuality and inclusion.

Fashioncore

In response to the hypermasculine image and style common in beatdown and hardcore in general during the 1990s, some bands rebelled against the hypermasculine image by refusing to look or act hypermasculine or even by dressing effeminately. Metalcore band Eighteen Visions contrasted the hardcore scene's usual aesthetic of "army sports clothes" with "skinny jeans, eyeliner and hairstyles influenced by Orgy and Unbroken". This visual style led to the band being called "fashioncore". "Fashioncore" was also considered a forerunner to 2000s emo fashion. Jasamine White-Gluz of Exclaim! wrote that Eighteen Visions look "more like a boy band than a popular hardcore group. Critics tag the band for putting fashion at the centre of their music, but it adds a playful and interesting touch to a band that sounds much tougher than it looks." Eighteen Visions received backlash from hardcore fans for their effeminate appearance. Nonetheless, Eighteen Visions inspired the fashion of many hardcore-influenced bands. Other bands labelled as fashioncore due to their use of eyeliner, straightened hair, and mouth piercings include Bleeding Through, Avenged Sevenfold, and Atreyu.

Some other bands, including AFI, American Nightmare and Poison the Well, also rebelled against this perceived hypermasculinity at this time, however through different methods than those involved in fashioncore.

Fusion genres

Metalcore

Metalcore is a genre known for combining elements (including breakdowns) of beatdown with elements of extreme metal, making metalcore far more metal-influenced than beatdown. Metalcore often features breakdowns, screaming, growling, heavy guitar riffs, and double bass drumming. Some metalcore bands use clean singing in choruses of songs while keeping screaming or growling in the verses of songs. Metalcore began in the 1990s as a much more heavy metal-oriented subgenre of beatdown with bands like Earth Crisis, Integrity, and Shai Hulud. In the 2000s, metalcore achieved success with bands like Killswitch Engage, All That Remains, Unearth, Bullet for My Valentine, and As I Lay Dying. These 2000s metalcore bands instead were different from traditional metalcore by combining traditional metalcore with melodic death metal. 2000s metalcore bands often were inspired by Swedish melodic death metal bands like At the Gates and In Flames.

See also
List of beatdown hardcore bands
Groove metal
Moshing
Sludge metal

References

 
Heavy metal genres
1990s in music
2000s in music
Hardcore punk genres
American styles of music
American rock music genres
Music of New York City
Music of California
Music of Florida
Music of New England